Gymnasium may refer to:

Gymnasium (ancient Greece), educational and sporting institution 
Gymnasium (school), type of secondary school that prepares students for higher education 
Gymnasium (Denmark)
Gymnasium (Germany)
Gymnasium UNT, high school of the National University of Tucumán, Argentina
Gym, an indoor place for physical exercise
Outdoor gym, an outdoor place for physical exercise
Gymnasium F.C., Douglas on the Isle of Man
"Gymnasium" (song), a 1984 song by Stephen Cummings